Pandanus thomensis is a species of trees in the family Pandanaceae. It is endemic to São Tomé Island.

References

thomensis
Flora of São Tomé Island
Endemic flora of São Tomé and Príncipe
Vulnerable plants
Taxonomy articles created by Polbot